Anivorano Est (also called Anivorano Gare) is a village and commune in the district of Brickaville Vohibinany (district), Atsinanana Region, Madagascar.

References

Cities in Madagascar
Populated places in Atsinanana